The Niger River is the main river of West Africa, extending about . Its source is in the Guinea Highlands in south-eastern Guinea near the Sierra Leone border. It runs in a crescent shape through Mali, Niger, on the border with Benin and then through Nigeria, discharging through a massive delta, known as the Niger Delta (or the Oil Rivers), into the Gulf of Guinea in the Atlantic Ocean. The Niger is the third-longest river in Africa, exceeded by the Nile and the Congo River. Its main tributary is the Benue River.

Etymology

The Niger has different names in the different languages of the region:
 Fula: Maayo Jaaliba 
 Manding: Jeliba  or Joliba  "great river"
 Tuareg: Egerew n-Igerewen  "river of rivers"
 Songhay: Isa "the river"
 Zarma: Isa Beeri "great river"
 Hausa: Kwara 
Nupe: Èdù
 Yoruba: Ọya "named after the Yoruba goddess Ọya, who is believed to embody the river"
 Igbo: Orimiri or Orimili "great water"
 Ijaw: Toru Beni "the river water"

The earliest use of the name "Niger" for the river is by Leo Africanus in his Della descrittione dell’Africa et delle cose notabili che ivi sono published in Italian in 1550. The name may come from a Berber phrase ger-n-ger meaning "river of rivers". As Timbuktu was the southern end of the principal Trans-Saharan trade route to the western Mediterranean, it was the source of most European knowledge of the region.

Medieval European maps applied the name Niger to the middle reaches of the river, in modern Mali, but Quorra (Kworra) to the lower reaches in modern Nigeria, as these were not recognized at the time as being the same river. When European colonial powers began to send ships along the west coast of Africa in the 16th and 17th centuries, the Senegal River was often postulated to be the seaward end of the Niger. It was only with the 18th-century visits of Mungo Park, who travelled down the Niger River and visited the great Sahelian empires of his day, that Europeans correctly identified the course of the Niger and extended the name to its entire course.

The modern nations of Nigeria and Niger take their names from the river, marking contesting national claims by colonial powers of the "upper", "lower" and "middle" Niger river basin during the Scramble for Africa at the end of the 19th century.

Geography

The Niger River is a relatively clear river, carrying only a tenth as much sediment as the Nile because the Niger's headwaters lie in ancient rocks that provide little silt. Like the Nile, the Niger floods yearly; this begins in September, peaks in November, and finishes by May. An unusual feature of the river is the Inner Niger Delta, which forms where its gradient suddenly decreases. The result is a region of braided streams, marshes, and large lakes; the seasonal floods make the Delta extremely productive for both fishing and agriculture.

The river loses nearly two-thirds of its potential flow in the Inner Delta between Ségou and Timbuktu to seepage and evaporation. The water from the Bani River, which flows into the Delta at Mopti, does not compensate for the losses. The average loss is estimated at 31 km3/year but varies considerably between years. The river is then joined by various tributaries but also loses more water to evaporation. The quantity of water entering Nigeria was estimated at 25 km3/year before the 1980s and at 13.5 km3/year during the 1980s.

The most important tributary is the Benue River which merges with the Niger at Lokoja in Nigeria. The total volume of tributaries in Nigeria is six times higher than the inflow into Nigeria, with a flow near the mouth of the river standing at 177.0 km3/year before the 1980s and 147.3 km3/year during the 1980s.

Course

The Niger takes one of the most unusual routes of any major river, a boomerang shape that baffled geographers for two centuries. Its source (Tembakounda) is 240 km (150 mi) inland from the Atlantic Ocean, but the river runs directly away from the sea into the Sahara Desert, then takes a sharp right turn near the ancient city of Timbuktu and heads southeast to the Gulf of Guinea. This strange geography apparently came about because the Niger River is two ancient rivers joined together. The upper Niger, from the source west of Timbuktu to the bend in the current river near Timbuktu, once emptied into a now dry lake to the east northeast of Timbuktu, while the lower Niger started to the south of Timbuktu and flowed south into the Gulf of Guinea. Over time upstream erosion by the lower Niger resulted in stream capture of the upper Niger by the lower Niger.

The northern part of the river, known as the Niger bend, is an important area because it is the major river and source of water in that part of the Sahara. This made it the focal point of trade across the western Sahara and the centre of the Sahelian kingdoms of Mali and Gao. The surrounding Niger River Basin is one of the distinct physiographic sections of the Sudan province, which in turn is part of the larger African massive physiographic division.

Drainage basin

The Niger River basin, located in western Africa, covers 7.5% of the continent and spreads over ten countries.

Niger River basin: areas and rainfall by country

Hydrometric stations on the Niger River

Discharge

Average, minimum and maximum  discharge of the Niger River at Koulikoro (Upper Niger), Niamey (Middle Niger) and Lokoja (Lower Niger). Period from 2000 to 2022.

Average discharge of the Niger River at Niger Delta (period from 2010 to 2018):

Tributaries

The main tributaries from the mouth:

History

At the end of the African humid period around 5,500 years before present, the modern Sahara Desert, once a savanna, underwent desertification. As plant species sharply declined, humans migrated to the fertile Niger River bend region, with abundant resources including plants for grazing and fish. Like in the Fertile Crescent, many food crops were domesticated in the Niger River region, including yams, African rice (Oryza glaberrima), and pearl millet. The Sahara aridification may have triggered, or at least accelerated, these domestications. Agriculture, as well as fishing and animal husbandry, led to the rise of settlements like Djenné-Djenno in the Inner Delta, now a World Heritage Site.

The region of the Niger bend, in the Sahel, was a key origin and destination for trans-Saharan trade, fueling the wealth of great empires such as the Ghana, Mali, and Songhai Empires. Major trading ports along the river, including Timbuktu and Gao, became centers of learning and culture. Trade to the Niger bend region also brought Islam to the region in approximately the 14th century CE. Much of the northern Niger basin remains Muslim today, although the southern reaches of the river tend to be Christian.

Classical writings on the interior of the Sahara begin with Ptolemy, who mentions two rivers in the desert: the "Gir" (Γειρ) and farther south, the "Nigir" (Νιγειρ).  The first has been since identified as the Wadi Ghir on the north-western edge of the Tuat, along the borders of modern Morocco and Algeria.  This would likely have been as far as Ptolemy would have had consistent records.  The Ni-Ger was likely speculation, although the name stuck as that of a river south of the Mediterranean's "known world". Suetonius reports Romans traveling to the "Ger", although in reporting any river's name derived from a Berber language, in which "gher" means "watercourse", confusion could easily arise. Pliny connected these two rivers as one long watercourse which flowed (via lakes and underground sections) into the Nile, a notion which persisted in the Arab and European worlds – and further added the Senegal River as the "Ger" –  until the 19th century.

While the true course of the Niger was presumably known to locals, it was a mystery to the outside world until the late 18th century. The connection to the Nile River was made not simply because this was then known as the great river of "Aethiopia" (by which all lands south of the desert were called by Classical writers), but because the Nile like the Niger flooded every summer.  Through the descriptions of Leo Africanus and even Ibn Battuta – despite his visit to the river – the myth connecting the Niger to the Nile persisted.

Many European expeditions to plot the river were unsuccessful. In 1788 the African Association was formed in England to promote the exploration of Africa in the hopes of locating the Niger, and in June 1796 the Scottish explorer Mungo Park was the first European to lay eyes on the middle portion of the river since antiquity (and perhaps ever). He wrote an account in 1799, Travels in the Interior of Africa. Park proposed a theory that the Niger and Congo were the same river. Although the Niger Delta would seem like an obvious candidate, it was a maze of streams and swamps that did not look like the head of a great river. He died in 1806 on a second expedition attempting to prove the Niger-Congo connection. The theory became the leading one in Europe. Several failed expeditions followed; however the mystery of the Niger would not be solved for another 25 years, in 1830, when Richard Lander and his brother became the first Europeans to follow the course of the Niger to the ocean.

In 1946, three Frenchmen, Jean Sauvy, Pierre Ponty and movie maker Jean Rouch, former civil servants in the African French colonies, set out to travel the entire length of the river, as no one else seemed to have done previously. They travelled from the beginning of the river near Kissidougou in Guinea, walking at first till a raft could be used, then changing to various local crafts as the river broadened and changed. Two of them reached the ocean on March 25, 1947, with Ponty having left the expedition at Niamey, somewhat past the halfway mark. They carried a 16mm movie camera, the resulting footage giving Rouch his first two ethnographic documentaries: "Au pays des mages noirs", and "La chasse à l’hippopotame". A camera was used to illustrate Rouch's subsequent book "Le Niger En Pirogue" (Fernand Nathan, 1954), as well as Sauvy's “Descente du Niger” (L'Harmattan, 2001). A typewriter was brought as well, on which Ponty produced newspaper articles he mailed out whenever possible.

Management and development 

The water in the Niger River basin is partially regulated through dams. In Mali the Sélingué Dam on the Sankarani River is mainly used for hydropower but also permits irrigation. Two diversion dams, one at Sotuba just downstream of Bamako, and one at Markala, just downstream of Ségou, are used to irrigate about 54,000 hectares. In Nigeria the Kainji Dam, Shiroro Dam, Zungeru Dam, and Jebba Dam are used to generate hydropower.

The water resources of the Niger River are under pressure because of increased water abstraction for irrigation. The construction of dams for hydropower generation is underway or envisaged in order to alleviate chronic power shortages in the countries of the Niger basin. The FAO estimates the irrigation potential of all countries in the Niger river basin at 2.8 million hectares. Only 0.93m hectares (ha) were under irrigation in the late 1980s. The irrigation potential was estimated at 1.68m ha in Nigeria 0.56m ha in Mali, and the actual irrigated area was 0.67m ha and 0.19m ha.

See also

Notes

References

External links

 Information and a map of the Niger's watershed on http://www.wri.org/resources
 Map of the Niger River basin at Water Resources eAtlas (link broken)
 Niger Currents: Exploring life and technology along the Niger River

International law and the Niger River
 Bibliography on Water Resources and International Law Peace Palace Library
 

 
Benin–Niger border
International rivers of Africa
Inner Niger Delta
Physiographic sections
Rivers of Benin
Rivers of Guinea
Rivers of Mali
Rivers of Niger
Rivers of Nigeria
Border rivers